Cape Kidnappers, known in Māori as  and officially gazetted as Cape Kidnappers / Te Kauwae-a-Māui, is a headland at the southeastern extremity of Hawke's Bay on the east coast of New Zealand's North Island and sits at the end of an  peninsula which protrudes into the Pacific Ocean. Access to the Cape by road stops at Clifton, which is the departure point for many tourists. The Cape Kidnappers Golf Course lies between the headland and the nearby coastal community of Te Awanga.

History
The headland was named after an attempt by local Māori to, according to Captain Cook, abduct a member of Cook's crew aboard HMS Endeavour, during a landfall there on 15 October 1769. The crew member was Taiata, the 12 year old nephew or servant of Tupaia, the Tahitian arioi who served as the Endeavour'''s interpreter and guide. Cook's journal states that Taiata was over the side of the ship when a Maori fishing vessel approached the Endeavour offering to trade fish, before seizing the boy and attempting to flee with him. Sailors from Endeavour′s deck immediately opened fire on the fishing boat, killing two Māori and wounding a third.

Ngāti Te Whatuiāpiti's perspective is that Rangatira Te Rangikoianake and his son Hawea led a rescue party in order to free what they thought was a young Māori boy being held captive on the ship. This history was acknowledged in the 2015 Heretaunga Tamatea Deed of Settlement with the Crown.

Taiata promptly jumped overboard and swam back to Endeavour, while the remaining Māori paddled their craft back to shore. A 4-pounder cannon was fired after them from Endeavour''′s quarterdeck, but the Māori boat was soon out of range. 

 

Cook described the cape as having steep white cliffs on either side, with two large rocks resembling hay stacks near the headland.

Following the passage of the Heretaunga Tamatea Claims Settlement Act 2018, the name of the headland was officially altered to Cape Kidnappers / Te Kauwae-a-Māui. The Māori portion of the name refers to 'the fish hook of Māui', referring to a legend in which the North Island is a large fish which was caught by the demigod Māui.

Important Bird Area
The cape has been identified as an Important Bird Area by BirdLife International because it is a breeding site for over 3000 pairs of Australasian gannets.

See also
Joseph Bryan Nelson and Kazimierz Wodzicki, who conducted important bird studies there.

References

Bibliography

External links 

Landforms of the Hawke's Bay Region
Kidnappers, Cape
History of the Hawke's Bay Region
Important Bird Areas of New Zealand
Hastings District
Rock formations of New Zealand